Jastrowiec  is a village in the administrative district of Gmina Bolków, within Jawor County, Lower Silesian Voivodeship, in south-western Poland. The village has a population of 163.

Gallery

References

Jastrowiec